Events in the year 1946 in Germany.

Events

January
 January: 
 German steel production limited to 25% of prewar level by the Allied Control Council.
 British occupation zone denazification responsibilities turned over to the Germans.
 Soviet 2nd Shock Army returned to the Soviet Union.
 8 January: Braunschweiger Zeitung founded.

February
 1 February: Southwest German Radio Symphony Orchestra founded.
 5 February: Soviet 47th Army disbanded.
 20 February: The worst explosion in German history kills more than 400 coal miners in Bergkamen.
 21 February: Die Zeit founded.

March
 March:
 Law for Liberation from National Socialism and Militarism turns denazification responsibility over to the Germans.
 Seventh United States Army inactivated.
 Bamberg Symphony founded.
 2 March: Rheinische Post founded.

April
 April: Badisches Volksecho founded.
 2 April: Die Welt founded.
 3 April: Lübecker Nachrichten founded.
 8 April: Sozialistische Einheit ceased publication.
 13 April: Sächsische Zeitung founded.
 21 April: 
 Merger of the KPD and SPD into the Socialist Unity Party of Germany.
 Deutsche Volkszeitung ceased publication.
 23 April: 
 Neues Deutschland founded.
 Das Volk ceased publication.

May
 16 May: Handelsblatt founded.
 17 May: DEFA film studio founded.
 20 May: Lausitzer Rundschau founded.

June
 June: Gehlen Organization established.
 29 June: Provisional German administration under Soviet supervision established in the state of Mecklenburg-Vorpommern.
 30 June: June 1946 Bavarian state election.

July
 July: Europa-Archiv founded.
 1 July: ABC-Zeitung founded.

August
 20 August: Dissolution of the Wehrmacht.

September
 6 September: Restatement of Policy on Germany.
 16 September: BRIXMIS established.

October
 1 October: Nuremberg trials conclude.
 20 October: 
 1946 Berlin state election.
 1946 Soviet occupation zone state elections.
 Rhine Province disestablished.

November
 13 November: Münchner Merkur founded.

December
 1 December: December 1946 Bavarian state election.
 5 December: Hamburg Ravensbrück trials begin.
 11 December: Hörzu founded.
 21 December: Middle Rhine Football Association founded.
 Christmas: First edition of Auto motor und sport appears.

Undated
 Average intake per day of 1,080 kilocalories.
 German Association for Housing, Urban and Spatial Development founded.
 Hansawelle founded.
 Südwest Presse founded.
 West German Athletics Championships established.
 Westphalian Football and Athletics Association founded.

Births 

 23 February — Bodo Hauser, German journalist and writer (died 2004)
 25 February — Franz Xaver Kroetz, German dramatist
 17 March — Georges J. F. Köhler, German biologist and Nobel laureate (d. 1995)
 27 March — Olaf Malolepski, German musician (Die Flippers)
 16 April – Mordechai Geldman, Israeli poet and writer (died 2021)
 17 April — Georges J. F. Köhler, German biologist (died 1995)
 9 May — Drafi Deutscher, German singer (died 2006)
 14 May — Elmar Brok, German politician
 15 May – Klaus-Peter Siegloch, German journalist
 17 May — Udo Lindenberg, German singer
 26 June — Maria von Welser, German journalist
 1 July:
 Stefan Aust, German journalist
 Rosalie Abella, German jurist
 20 August 
 Henryk M. Broder, German journalist
 Ralf Hütter, German techno musician
 6 October — Renate Holub, German philosopher
 14 December — Ruth Fuchs, German athlete
 30 December — Berti Vogts, German football player and manager

Deaths 

 February 8 - Felix Hoffmann, German chemist (born 1868)
 February 10 - Eduard Fresenius, German entrepreneur (born 1874)
 May 16 - Bruno Tesch, German chemist and entrepreneur (born 1890)
 June 6 - Gerhart Hauptmann, German dramatist (born 1862)
 September 6 - Alfred Körte, German philologist (born 1866)
 15 October — Hermann Göring, World War I fighter ace and Reichsmarshall of Nazi Germany (born 1893)
 16 October — Alfred Rosenberg, Nazi ideologue (born 1893)
 Date unknown — Albert Hinrich Hussmann, artist and sculptor

References

 
1940s in Germany
Years of the 20th century in Germany
Germany
Germany